Helen Plaschinski Farca (born April 8, 1963) is a former female freestyle swimmer from Mexico, who participated in the 1980 Summer Olympics for her native country. Her best result in Moscow, Soviet Union was a sixth place in the Women's 4 × 100 m Freestyle Relay.

She competed in the 1977 Maccabiah Games (as a 14 year old) and the 1981 Maccabiah Games in Israel. In each, she won gold medals in the 100 and 200 m freestyle.

References

1963 births
Living people
Mexican people of Polish descent
Mexican female freestyle swimmers
Swimmers at the 1979 Pan American Games
Swimmers at the 1980 Summer Olympics
Olympic swimmers of Mexico
Place of birth missing (living people)
Pan American Games bronze medalists for Mexico
Pan American Games medalists in swimming
Central American and Caribbean Games gold medalists for Mexico
Jewish swimmers
Maccabiah Games gold medalists for Mexico
Maccabiah Games medalists in swimming
Competitors at the 1977 Maccabiah Games
Competitors at the 1981 Maccabiah Games
Central American and Caribbean Games medalists in swimming
Competitors at the 1978 Central American and Caribbean Games
Medalists at the 1979 Pan American Games
20th-century Mexican women
21st-century Mexican women